Asartepe Dam is a dam in Ankara Province, Turkey, built between 1975 and 1980.

See also
List of dams and reservoirs in Turkey

External links
DSI

Dams in Ankara Province
Dams completed in 1980